Oneida Corners is a hamlet within the town of Queensbury in Warren County in the U.S. state of New York.

Geography
Oneida Corners is situated at the intersection of New York State Route 9L (Ridge Road), extending west along County Route 54 (Sunnyside Road) and east along County Route 39 (Sunnyside Road East).

History
Around the time of the American Revolutionary War, the hamlet was a prominent settlement featuring two inns, three shops, a lumber business, mechanic shops, and a church. Court was held at least once weekly in the hamlet. Shortly before the war, an Oneida Indian by the name of Thomas Hammond ran a thriving business at the corner. His establishment being a frame of reference, the area came to be known as "the Oneidas" — and later as Oneida Corners — around 1800.

References

External links
 History of Oneida Corners

Hamlets in New York (state)
Queensbury, New York
Glens Falls metropolitan area
Hamlets in Warren County, New York